The 2003 NCAA Division II football season, part of college football in the United States organized by the National Collegiate Athletic Association at the Division II level, began on September 6, 2003, and concluded with the NCAA Division II Football Championship on December 13, 2003 at Braly Municipal Stadium in Florence, Alabama, hosted by the University of North Alabama. The Grand Valley State Lakers defeated the North Dakota Fighting Sioux, 10–3, to win their second Division II national title.

The Harlon Hill Trophy was awarded to Will Hall, quarterback from North Alabama.

Conference changes and new programs

Conference changes

Conference standings

Conference summaries

Postseason

The 2003 NCAA Division II Football Championship playoffs were the 30th single-elimination tournament to determine the national champion of men's NCAA Division II. This was the final year of the 16-team bracket before the field expanded to 24 teams in 2004.

Playoff bracket

See also
 2003 NCAA Division I-A football season
 2003 NCAA Division I-AA football season
 2003 NCAA Division III football season
 2003 NAIA football season

References